Prionapteryx acreonalis is a moth in the family Crambidae. It was described by Francis Walker in 1863. It is found in Sri Lanka.

References

Ancylolomiini
Moths described in 1863